Stephen D. Hill (born December 18, 1950 in Fort Scott, Kansas) is a judge of the Kansas Court of Appeals. He was appointed by Governor Kathleen Sebelius in 2003.

Legal career
Hill started his own law firm, Hill & Wisler, in 1975. The next year, he became a Linn County Attorney. In 1981, he was appointed Associate District Judge in the Sixth Judicial District of Kansas.  He became a District Judge the following year. He later became an Administrative Judge and then the Chief Judge of the district.

Biography
Hill graduated from the University of Kansas with a B.A. in English in 1972.  He went on to receive his J.D. from the Washburn University School of Law in 1975. He is now married and has two adult sons.

References

External links
 Kansas Court of Appeals website

Kansas Court of Appeals Judges
Living people
1950 births
People from Fort Scott, Kansas
University of Kansas alumni
Washburn University alumni
20th-century American lawyers
21st-century American judges